Kevin Farr (19 March 1951 – 21 May 2011) was a South African cricketer. He played in one List A and two first-class matches for Border in 1975/76 and 1976/77.

See also
 List of Border representative cricketers

References

External links
 

1951 births
2011 deaths
South African cricketers
Border cricketers
Cricketers from East London, Eastern Cape